June Covington is a fictional character appearing in American comic books published by Marvel Comics.

Publication history
June Covington first appeared in the first issue of the 2011 Osborn limited series, and was created by Kelly Sue DeConnick and Emma Rios.

June Covington began appearing as a regular character in the Dark Avengers series, beginning with Dark Avengers #175.

Fictional character biography
June Covington started out as a postgrad student who was bored with her life working at a university. She later met a biologist named Edward Wynne who had a birth defect on his left arm. June then decided to take up an interest in getting rid of genetic imperfections and became a scientist. After a few genetic failures and finally testing on herself, June was able to perfect her own genetics. A year later, she met Edward Wynne again and presented him with a gift. Edward rejected her gift and methods and handed her over to the police. Covington's laboratory was shut down and she was dismissed from the university. Sometime later, Covington encountered Wynne again, claiming that she had changed in order to prove herself. She lured Wynne to a lab, where she injected a genetic plug into him which paralyzed his body. After inducing cranial explosive failure on 18 people during a prayer meeting for special needs children, Covington was apprehended by the authorities. She was incarcerated in a secret government base somewhere underwater. While imprisoned, she met fellow inmates Norman Osborn, Ai Apaec, Kingmaker, and Carny Rives. They planned a breakout. After the inmates secured an escape pod and made their way to the surface, June stayed with Norman Osborn to be his doctor.

Covington became a member of the second incarnation of Norman Osborn's Dark Avengers, in which she was that group's version of Scarlet Witch. In the group's first battle with the New Avengers, Covington manages to successfully injure Doctor Strange. June and the other members of the Dark Avengers are defeated by both Avengers teams when it turns out that her teammate Skaar was the Avengers' double-agent.

When the Dark Avengers are thrown into an alternate reality, Covington and the rest of the Dark Avengers with her are disabled by the control nanites placed on them by that reality's version of Hank Pym. As he gets to work, Covington begins to regain consciousness. Having gotten control of Henry Pym, Covington learns the history of this reality and then uses some Stark teleportation technology to remove a device from Ragnarok's brain. Covington is seemingly able to restore John Walker's lost limbs with help from this reality's version of the Venom symbiote which had been lobotomized. Covington informs Barney Barton and Ai Apaec about the world that they are in as they watch the turf war on a nearby screen where they are unaware that the turf war was caused by this reality's Doctor Strange. Covington remains with the Dark Avengers until they manage to flee the alternate reality and return to their own, whereupon the team escapes custody and disbands.

Covington returns during the Inhumanity storyline, now sporting a new costume and no longer calling herself Scarlet Witch. She kidnaps the Terrigenesis Cocoon of one of the new Human/Inhuman hybrids, which draws the attention of Spider-Girl and the Avengers. Spider-Girl enlisted the Avengers to help her recover the Terrigenesis Cocoon because it contained Anya's social studies teacher Mr. Schlickeisen. After waging a campaign against Advanced Idea Mechanics, Covington is defeated after being gagged and paralyzed by Spider-Girl.<ref>Avengers Assemble #25</ref>

Powers and abilities
June Covington experimented on herself with her own Genetic Plug-in technology, giving her powers such as antiseptic breath, bones that soften to diffuse impact, and glands that distribute megadoses of Relaxin to allow her joints to dislocate with ease. She has a neurotoxin in her blood to which she is immune, and which she delivers using her razor-sharp fingernails. She also possesses surgically implanted gills, which allowed her to survive having her mouth and nose webbed shut by Spider-Girl.

In other media
Novels
 June Covington makes a brief cameo in the prose novel New Avengers: Breakout'' by Alisa Kwitney. She appears as one of the escapees from the Raft and briefly battles Jessica Drew.

References

External links
 June Covington at Marvel Wiki
 June Covington at Comic Vine

Characters created by Kelly Sue DeConnick
Comics characters introduced in 2011
Marvel Comics female supervillains
Marvel Comics mutates